Chudinovo is the name of several rural localities in Russia:
Chudinovo, Arkhangelsk Oblast, a village in Vyysky Selsoviet of Verkhnetoyemsky District of Arkhangelsk Oblast
Chudinovo, Chelyabinsk Oblast, a selo in Chudinovsky Selsoviet of Oktyabrsky District of Chelyabinsk Oblast
Chudinovo, Kirov Oblast, a selo in Podgorodny Rural Okrug of Orlovsky District of Kirov Oblast
Chudinovo, Leningrad Oblast, a village in Osminskoye Settlement Municipal Formation of Luzhsky District of Leningrad Oblast
Chudinovo, Moscow Oblast, a village in Barantsevskoye Rural Settlement of Chekhovsky District of Moscow Oblast
Chudinovo, Nizhny Novgorod Oblast, a village in Grudtsinsky Selsoviet of Pavlovsky District of Nizhny Novgorod Oblast
Chudinovo, Novgorod Oblast, a village in Velikoselskoye Settlement of Starorussky District of Novgorod Oblast
Chudinovo, Novosibirsk Oblast, a selo in Maslyaninsky District of Novosibirsk Oblast
Chudinovo, Perm Krai, a village in Nytvensky District of Perm Krai
Chudinovo, Kimrsky District, Tver Oblast, a village in Kimrsky District, Tver Oblast
Chudinovo, Kuvshinovsky District, Tver Oblast, a village in Kuvshinovsky District, Tver Oblast
Chudinovo, Vladimir Oblast, a village in Vyaznikovsky District of Vladimir Oblast
Chudinovo, Vologda Oblast, a village in Andronovsky Selsoviet of Kaduysky District of Vologda Oblast
Chudinovo, Chudinovsky Rural Okrug, Bolsheselsky District, Yaroslavl Oblast, a village in Chudinovsky Rural Okrug of Bolsheselsky District of Yaroslavl Oblast
Chudinovo, Markovsky Rural Okrug, Bolsheselsky District, Yaroslavl Oblast, a village in Markovsky Rural Okrug of Bolsheselsky District of Yaroslavl Oblast
Chudinovo, Borisoglebsky District, Yaroslavl Oblast, a village in Yakovtsevsky Rural Okrug of Borisoglebsky District of Yaroslavl Oblast
Chudinovo, Osetsky Rural Okrug, Lyubimsky District, Yaroslavl Oblast, a village in Osetsky Rural Okrug of Lyubimsky District of Yaroslavl Oblast
Chudinovo, Osetsky Rural Okrug, Lyubimsky District, Yaroslavl Oblast, a village in Osetsky Rural Okrug of Lyubimsky District of Yaroslavl Oblast
Chudinovo, Glebovsky Rural Okrug, Rybinsky District, Yaroslavl Oblast, a village in Glebovsky Rural Okrug of Rybinsky District of Yaroslavl Oblast
Chudinovo, Mikhaylovsky Rural Okrug, Rybinsky District, Yaroslavl Oblast, a village in Mikhaylovsky Rural Okrug of Rybinsky District of Yaroslavl Oblast
Chudinovo, Tutayevsky District, Yaroslavl Oblast, a village in Velikoselsky Rural Okrug of Tutayevsky District of Yaroslavl Oblast